Micragrotis exusta is a species of moth of the family Noctuidae first described by George Hampson in 1903. It is found in Africa, including South Africa.

External links
 

Noctuinae
Lepidoptera of South Africa
Lepidoptera of Zimbabwe
Moths of Sub-Saharan Africa